Stellenleiter ("Area Leader") was a Nazi Party political rank which existed between 1933 and 1938.  The rank was created as a mid-level political position intended to replace the older rank of Zellenwart ("cell guard"), also known as Zellenleiter.  In the early Nazi Party rank organization, the position of Stellenleiter was senior to Mitarbeiter and junior to Amtsleiter.

The rank of Stellenleiter was phased out of the Nazi Party in 1939, replaced by a new series of para-military political ranks.

Responsibilities

On the county and town level of the Nazi Party, the Stellenleiter typically served in the positional role of Zellenleiter and was often referred to as such in contrast to their actual political rank.  On higher levels of the Nazi party (County, Region, and National level), Stellenleiter was an administrative staff officer type position.

Insignia

There were two primary levels of the rank, these being Stellenleiter and Hauptstellenleiter ("senior area leader"), indicated by a "L" shaped collar tab device worn on the brown Nazi Party shirt.  On the National Party Level (Reichsleitung) an additional rank of Hilfs-Stellenleiter ("Assistant Area Leader") existed, with the national rank of Hauptstellenleiter denoted by Red Army-style collar tabs.

References
 Clark, J. (2007). Uniforms of the NSDAP. Atglen, PA: Schiffer Publishing

Nazi political ranks